Gibberifera qingchengensis is a species of moth of the family Tortricidae. It is found in China (Tianjin, Sichuan, Guizhou).

References

Moths described in 1996
Eucosmini